Columbia County is one of the 36 counties in the U.S. state of Oregon. As of the 2020 census, the population was 52,589. The county seat is St. Helens.

History

The Chinook and Clatskanie Native American peoples inhabited this region for centuries prior to the arrival of Robert Gray, captain of the ship Columbia Rediviva, in 1792. The Lewis and Clark Expedition traveled and camped along the Columbia River shore in the area later known as Columbia County in late 1805 and again on their return journey in early 1806.

Columbia County was created in 1854 from the northern half of Washington County. Milton served as the county seat until 1857 when it was moved to St. Helens.

Columbia County has been afflicted by numerous flooding disasters, the most recent in December 2007. Heavy rains caused the Nehalem River to escape its banks and flood the city of Vernonia and rural areas nearby. Columbia County received a presidential disaster declaration for this event.

Geography
It is Oregon's third-smallest county by land area and fourth-smallest by total area.

Adjacent counties
 Wahkiakum County, Washington (northwest)
 Cowlitz County, Washington (northeast)
 Clark County, Washington (east)
 Multnomah County (southeast)
 Washington County (south)
 Clatsop County (west)

National protected area
Julia Butler Hansen National Wildlife Refuge (part)

Demographics

2000 census
As of the census of 2000, there were 43,560 people, 16,375 households, and 12,035 families living in the county.  The population density was 66 people per square mile (26/km2).  There were 17,572 housing units at an average density of 27 per square mile (10/km2).  The racial makeup of the county was 94.42% White, 0.24% Black or African American, 1.33% Native American, 0.59% Asian, 0.10% Pacific Islander, 0.79% from other races, and 2.53% from two or more races.  2.51% of the population were Hispanic or Latino of any race. 21.2% were of German, 10.8% English, 9.4% American, 9.3% Irish and 5.4% Norwegian ancestry.

There were 16,375 households, out of which 34.40% had children under the age of 18 living with them, 60.50% were married couples living together, 8.70% had a female householder with no husband present, and 26.50% were non-families. 21.10% of all households were made up of individuals, and 8.10% had someone living alone who was 65 years of age or older.  The average household size was 2.65 and the average family size was 3.06.

In the county, the population was spread out, with 27.30% under the age of 18, 7.00% from 18 to 24, 28.10% from 25 to 44, 26.00% from 45 to 64, and 11.60% who were 65 years of age or older.  The median age was 38 years. For every 100 females, there were 100.00 males.  For every 100 females age 18 and over, there were 98.10 males.

The median income for a household in the county was $45,797, and the median income for a family was $51,381. Males had a median income of $42,227 versus $27,216 for females. The per capita income for the county was $20,078.  About 6.70% of families and 9.10% of the population were below the poverty line, including 11.60% of those under age 18 and 7.00% of those age 65 or over.

2010 census
As of the 2010 census, there were 49,351 people, 19,183 households, and 13,516 families living in the county. The racial makeup of the county was 92.5% white, 1.3% American Indian, 0.9% Asian, 0.4% black or African American, 0.2% Pacific islander, 1.2% from other races, and 3.4% from two or more races. Those of Hispanic or Latino origin made up 4.0% of the population. In terms of ancestry, 26.1% were German, 14.5% were English, 14.4% were Irish, 5.9% were Norwegian, and 4.8% were American.

Of the 19,183 households, 32.0% had children under the age of 18 living with them, 55.5% were married couples living together, 9.8% had a female householder with no husband present, 29.5% were non-families, and 23.3% of all households were made up of individuals. The average household size was 2.55 and the average family size was 2.98. The median age was 41.3 years.

The median income for a household in the county was $55,199 and the median income for a family was $62,728. Males had a median income of $52,989 versus $35,558 for females. The per capita income for the county was $24,613. About 6.5% of families and 10.3% of the population were below the poverty line, including 12.7% of those under age 18 and 6.6% of those age 65 or over.

Communities

Cities
Clatskanie
Columbia City
Prescott
Rainier
St. Helens (county seat)
Scappoose
Vernonia

Census-designated places
Deer Island
Warren

Unincorporated communities

 Alston
 Apiary
 Birkenfeld
 Delena
 Goble
 Inglis
 Keasey
 Kerry
 Lindbergh
 Marshland
 Mayger
 McNulty
 Mist
 Pittsburg
 Quincy
 Riverside
 Woodson
 Yankton

Media and news
Columbia County had newspapers as early as 1891, with the launch of the Clatskanie Chief. The Rainier Review was launched in 1895. The St. Helens Chronicle, which grew out of a series of mergers of the Chronicle, the Sentinel, and the Mist (which was founded in 1881), serves as a newspaper of record for the county. The South County Spotlight, launched in 1961, serves the region along, with a circulation of 3,600. Columbia County has one AM radio station, KOHI AM 1600, which has broadcast continually since 1959. The station is locally owned, with an FCC-estimated weekly listenership of 10,000.

Government
The county is governed by an elected board of three commissioners. Each commissioner is elected to a term of four years. Other elected officials include the sheriff, county clerk, district attorney, treasurer, surveyor, assessor and justice of the peace.

Politics
Between 1932 and 2012, the county was among the most consistently Democratic in the United States in terms of presidential elections. The last Republican to win a majority in Columbia County had been Herbert Hoover in the 1928 presidential election, although before 1930 no Democrat had won a majority in the county since Samuel J. Tilden in 1876. In the 1952 presidential election, this was the only county in the state not to back Dwight Eisenhower. However, Columbia County has begun to shift to more conservative politics in recent elections. In 2016, Donald Trump won the county with just under fifty percent of the vote, a break with the tradition of choosing Democrats for president. Trump would repeat his win in the county 4 years later with an absolute majority of the vote.

While Colombia had an 80-year streak of voting for the Democratic nominee, the margin had been as narrow as three percent in 2004 and in 1984.

Columbia County is part of Oregon's 1st congressional district, which is represented by Suzanne Bonamici and has a Cook Partisan Voting Index score of D+8. In the Oregon House of Representatives, nearly all of Columbia County is included within the 31st House District with the northwestern portion in the 32nd District, respectively represented by Republicans Brian G. Stout and Cyrus B. Javadi. In the Oregon State Senate, Columbia County is in the 16th District, represented by Republican Suzanne Weber.

Economy
The primary industries are wood products and paper manufacturing, trade, construction and horticulture. The extensive stands of old-growth timber, which had attracted many of the early settlers to the area, were completely logged over by the 1950s. Second-growth timber provides the raw material for local lumber and paper mills. About half the county's workforce commutes out of the county to work, most to the nearby Portland, Oregon, metro area. Columbia County's average non-farm employment was 10,740 in 2007. The five largest private employers in Columbia County are Fred Meyer, Cascade Tissue Group, Wal-Mart, OMIC, USIA, and USG.

Transportation

Public transit 
Columbia County Rider (CC Rider), a service of the Columbia County Transit Division, provides six intercity bus lines and one "flex route" serving various points of downtown St. Helens and downtown Scappoose. From 2016 to 2022, CC Rider buses were operated by contract drivers supplied by MTR Western, a charter motor coach operator, but since July 2022 the county has operated the service directly.

The transit service is largely funded by grants from the Oregon Department of Transportation and the federal government. Attempts at making CC Rider a separate transit district and to introduce new taxes to fund it have repeatedly failed since 2015. Columbia County and nearby Clatsop County are currently studying options on consolidating the two county's transit services.

Single-ride fares range from $2 to $6 per ride, depending on number of zones traveled. A ride to Astoria costs up to $10 per ride each way.

Major highways

See also
National Register of Historic Places listings in Columbia County, Oregon

References

 
1854 establishments in Oregon Territory
Populated places established in 1854
Portland metropolitan area counties